Lawrence is an unincorporated community and census-designated place in Chemung Township, McHenry County, Illinois, United States. It was named a CDP before the 2020 census, at which time it had a population of 220.

History
A post office called Lawrence was established in 1856, and remained in operation until it was discontinued in 1903. The community was named for Lawrence Bigsby, the owner of the original town site.

Demographics

2020 census

January 2008 Tornado

In early January 2008, an ef3 tornado went through Lawrence. This caused major damage to several houses in the community. Although no deaths were reported, several injuries occurred. Although the initial tornado did little damage, a train that was operated by Wisconsin rail had been derailed and a tanker car containing radioactive elements smashed into the back of the locomotive before flipping over and leaking radioactive elements over the rails. This caused concerns to the community of Lawrence and later evacuating people in Lawrence and northern areas of the nearby town of Harvard. a fire was reported after the derailing of the train. The damage in the train crash is not known. Although the tornado alone caused about 8.3 million dollars in damages most likely from the train crash as the tornado did minor damage outside of Lawrence.

References

Census-designated places in Illinois
Census-designated places in McHenry County, Illinois
Chicago metropolitan area
Unincorporated communities in McHenry County, Illinois
Unincorporated communities in Illinois